Mirjam Overdam (born 18 February 1973) was a Dutch female water polo player. She was a member of the Netherlands women's national water polo team.

She competed with the team at the 2000 Summer Olympics.

References

External links
 
 https://www.rtlnieuws.nl/buurtfacts/opmerkelijk!/olympiers/zuid-holland/waddinxveen///mirjam-overdam-waddinxveen
 http://www.volkskrant.nl/sport/selectie-waterpolosters-gaat-in-brisbane-trainen~a576398/
 https://www.newspapers.com/newspage/120654256/
 https://www.nocnsf.nl/CMS/showpage.aspx?id=756&indexparticipant=2293&cciqsd=9132F0D03DD3D0ED61C6ADED84E73B67&cciqsids=id,indexparticipant

1973 births
Living people
Dutch female water polo players
Water polo players at the 2000 Summer Olympics
Olympic water polo players of the Netherlands
People from Waddinxveen
Sportspeople from South Holland